The initials B. J. as a given name or nickname may refer to:

In arts and entertainment

Film, television, and theatre
 B. J. Averell (born 1979), an American online tutor and reality television contestant
 B. J. Novak (born 1979), an American comedian and writer
 B. J. Porter (born 1971), an American actor
 B. J. Ward (actress) (born 1944), an American actress
 B. J. Whitmer (born 1978), an American professional wrestler

Literature
 B. J. Daniels (writer), an American author of contemporary romance novels
 BJ Gallagher, a speaker and author
 B. J. Oliphant (born 1929), pseudonym for Sheri Stewart Tepper, an American author
 BJ Ward (poet) (born 1967), an American poet

Music
 BJ Klock (born 1990), an American Entrepreneur & Music Producer 
 Billie Joe Armstrong (born 1972), lead singer of the band Green Day
 BJ the Chicago Kid, an American singer-songwriter
 B. J. Cole (born 1946), an English pedal steel guitarist famous for playing in the band Cochise
 B. J. Leiderman (born 1956), an American composer and songwriter
 B. J. Nilsen (born 1975), a Swedish sound artist
 B. J. Thomas (1942–2021), an American singer
 B.J. Wilson (1947–1990), an English drummer for the band Procol Harum

In government and politics
 B. J. Cruz (born 1951), an American judge and politician from Guam
 B. J. Habibie (born 1936), the third President of Indonesia, holding office from 1998 to 1999
 B.J. Lawson (born 1974), an American politician
 B. J. Panda, an Indian politician
 B. J. Vorster (1915–1983), Prime Minister and President of South Africa

In sport

American and Canadian football (gridiron football)
 B. J. Askew (born 1980), an American football fullback for the Tampa Bay Buccaneers of the NFL
 B. J. Bello (born 1994), an American football player
 B. J. Baylor (born 1997), American football player
 B. J. Cohen (born 1975), an American football offensive lineman/defensive lineman
 B. J. Daniels (American football), American football quarterback
 B. J. Gallis (born 1975), a former football linebacker in the Canadian Football League
 B. J. Raji (born 1986), an American football player
 B. J. Sams (American football) (born 1980), an American football player
 B. J. Sander (born 1980), an American football player
 B. J. Symons (born 1980), an American football player
 B. J. Tucker (born 1980), an American football player
 B. J. Ward (American football) (born 1981), an American football player

Baseball
 B. J. LaMura (born 1981), an American baseball player
 B. J. Ryan (born 1975), an American baseball player
 B. J. Surhoff (born 1964), an American baseball player
 B. J. Upton, now known as Melvin Upton, Jr. (born 1984), an American baseball player

Basketball
 B. J. Armstrong (born 1967), a retired American professional basketball player
 BJ McKie (born 1977), an American basketball player
 B. J. Tyler (born 1971), an American former professional basketball player

Ice hockey
 B.J. Crombeen (born 1985), a Canadian professional ice hockey player
 B. J. Young (ice hockey) (1977–2005), a professional ice hockey right player

Other sports
 BJ Botha (born 1980), South African rugby union player
 B. J. Flores (born 1979), Mexican American professional boxer
 B. J. Johnson (born 1987), American swimmer
 B. J. Penn (born 1978), American mixed martial arts fighter

In other fields
 B. J. Fogg, American behavioral psychologist
 B. J. Kennedy (1921–2003), American physician
 B. J. Palmer (1881–1961), pioneer of Chiropractic
 B. J. Sams (television) (born 1935), American news anchor on Today's THV This Morning

Fictional characters
 B.J. (dinosaur) a character from the children's television program Barney & Friends
 BJ Birdie, former mascot for the Toronto Blue Jays baseball team
 B. J. Hunnicutt, a fictional doctor on the TV show M*A*S*H
 B. J. Jones, a character on the ABC soap opera General Hospital
 BJ Smith, a character in the video game Grand Theft Auto: Vice City
 B.J. Walker, a character on the American soap opera Santa Barbara
 William "B.J." Blazkowicz, the protagonist of the video game series Wolfenstein
 Billy Joe "B. J." McKay, the protagonist of the TV show B. J. and the Bear

See also
BJ (disambiguation)